Zethesides is a genus of moths of the family Noctuidae described by George Hampson in 1926.

Species
Zethesides bettoni (Butler, 1898)
Zethesides haesitans (Walker, 1858) (syn: Zethesides umbrifera (C. Swinhoe, 1890))
Zethesides hesperioides (Guenée, 1852)
Zethesides pusilla Hampson, 1926
Zethesides serangodes Viette, 1956
Zethesides simplex D. S. Fletcher, 1955

References

Calpinae